Garryowen may refer to:

 Garryowen, Limerick, Ireland, a suburb of the Irish city
 Garryowen Football Club, a Limerick rugby union club
 Garryowen (rugby) or "up and under" or "bomb", a rugby union tactical kicking ploy
 Garryowen, Iowa, United States
 Garryowen, Montana, United States
 "Garryowen" (air), an Irish jig tune
 Garryowen (film), a 1920 British film
 Garry Owen or the U.S. 7th Cavalry Regiment
 Edmund Finn or Garryowen (1819–1898), Irish-Australian writer
 Garryowen, New South Wales, small settlement on Little Billabong Creek
 Garry Owen (actor) (1902–1951), American actor
 Garryowen Equestrienne Turnout, the major equestrienne competition of Australia held at the Royal Melbourne Show

See also 
 Gary Owen (disambiguation)